WW domain-containing oxidoreductase is an enzyme that in humans is encoded by the WWOX gene.

Function 

WW domain-containing proteins are found in all eukaryotes and play an important role in the regulation of a wide variety of cellular functions such as protein degradation, transcription, and RNA splicing. This gene encodes a protein which contains 2 WW domains and a short-chain dehydrogenase/reductase domain (SRD). The highest normal expression of this gene is detected in hormonally regulated tissues such as testis, ovary, and prostate. This expression pattern and the presence of an SRD domain suggest a role for this gene in steroid metabolism. The encoded protein is more than 90% identical to the mouse protein, which is an essential mediator of tumor necrosis factor-alpha-induced apoptosis, suggesting a similar, important role in apoptosis for the human protein. In addition, there is evidence that this gene behaves as a suppressor of tumor growth. Alternative splicing of this gene generates transcript variants that encode different isoforms.

WWOX is also known as human accelerated region 6.  It may, therefore, have played a key role in differentiating humans from apes.

Interactions 

WWOX has been shown to interact with P53 and ACK1.

References

Further reading